Mount Agassiz is a peak in the Uinta Mountains of northeastern Utah with an elevation of . It is located in the High Uintas Wilderness and the Uinta-Wasatch-Cache National Forest. The summit is named in honor of Louis Agassiz, a well-known paleontologist, glaciologist and geologist.

References

External links
 
 
 

Agassiz
Agassiz
Mountains of Duchesne County, Utah
Mountains of Summit County, Utah